The 1958 Idaho gubernatorial election was held on November 4. Incumbent Republican Robert E. Smylie defeated Democratic nominee Alfred M. Derr with 50.96% of the vote.

Since changing to four-year term for governor beginning with the  1946 election, this was the first time the incumbent was permitted to run for re-election, due to a change in the state's constitution, approved by voters in November 1956. The last incumbent to be re-elected was C. Ben Ross, who won a third two-year term in 1934.

Primary elections
Primary elections were held on August 12, 1958.

Democratic primary

Candidates
Alfred M. Derr, Clark Fork state senator
H. Max Hanson, Fairfield state senator
John Glasby, Mountain Home, former state party chairman
Omar Maine, Parma farmer

Results

Republican primary

Candidate
Robert E. Smylie, incumbent governor (unopposed)

Results

General election

Candidates
Robert E. Smylie, Republican 
Alfred M. Derr, Democratic

Results

References

1958
Idaho
November 1958 events in the United States